Selimiye is a village in Muğla Province, near Milas, Turkey.
In the vicinity are the ruins of the ancient city of Euromus.

Towns in Turkey